Steve Davis (born in 1958)  is an American jazz drummer.

Discography

As leader
 Songs We Know (DMP, 1996)
 Explorations and Impressions with Richie Beirach, Francois Moutin (Double-Time, 1997)
 Modern Days and Nights: Music of Cole Porter (Double-Time, 1997)
 Quality of Silence (DMP, 1999)
 Light with Jeanfrançois Prins (GAM, 2001)

With Lynne Arriale
 The Eyes Have It (DMP, 1994)
 When You Listen (DMP, 1995)
 With Words Unspoken (DMP, 1996)
 A Long Road Home (TCB, 1997)
 Melody (TCB, 1999)
 Live at Montreux (TCB, 2000)
 Inspiration (TCB, 2002)
 Come Together (In+Out, 2004)
 Arise (In+Out, 2004)
 Live (Motema, 2005)

As sideman
 Jamey Aebersold, Groovin' High (JA, 1988)
 Jamey Aebersold, In a Mellow Tone: Duke Ellington (JA, 1990)
 Jamey Aebersold, Vol. 50: The Magic of Miles Davis (JA, 1991)
 Joe Beck and Ali Ryerson, Alto (DMP, 1999)
 Manfredo Fest, Just Jobim (DMP, 1999)
 Monika Herzig, In Your Own Sweet Voice (Acme, 2004)
 Wolfgang Lackerschmid, Wolfgang Lackerschmid Quartet (TCB, 2015)
 Walt Weiskopf, Night Lights (Double-Time, 1995)

References

External links
 Official site

Living people
Jazz musicians from California
Musicians from Santa Barbara, California
American jazz drummers
1958 births
Double-Time Records artists